Vjeročka Zimova (21 March 1953 – 7 November 2020), better known as Vera Zima, was a Croatian actress.

She appeared in more than fifty films since 1975. She was of paternal Slovak descent.

Selected filmography

References

External links 

 

1953 births
People from Metković
Croatian film actresses
Golden Arena winners

2020 deaths
Croatian people of Slovak descent
Vladimir Nazor Award winners